King William's Town, officially Qonce, is a city in the Eastern Cape province of South Africa along the banks of the Buffalo River. It has a population of around 35,000 inhabitants and forms part of the Buffalo City Metropolitan Municipality.

The city has one of the oldest post offices in the country developed by missionaries led by Charles Brownlee.

History 
For thousands of years, the area was roamed by Bushman bands, and then was used as grazing by the nomadic Khoikhoi, who called the Buffalo River Qonce. Xhosa people lived alongside the Khoikhoi eventually taking over the land after Queen Hoho lost the war with King Ngqika kaMlawu.

King William's Town was founded by Sir Benjamin d’Urban in May 1835 during the Xhosa War of that year. The town stands on the site of the kraal of the minor chief Dyani Tyatyu and was named after William IV. It was abandoned in December 1836, but was reoccupied in 1846 and was the capital of British Kaffraria from its creation in 1847 to its incorporation in 1865 with the Cape Colony. Uniquely in the Cape Colony, its local government was styled a borough, rather than a municipality. Many of the colonists in the neighbouring districts are descendants of members of the British German Legion disbanded after the Crimean War and provided with homes in the Cape Colony; hence such names as Berlin, Braunschweig, Frankfurt, Hamburg, Potsdam and Stutterheim given to settlements in this part of the country.

It was declared the provincial capital of the surrounding Queen Adelaide's Province in the 1830s. On 5 May 1877, the Cape Government of Prime Minister John Molteno opened the first railway, connecting the town to East London on the coast and to the Xhosa lands inland and further east. With its direct railway communication, the town became an important entrepôt for trade with the Xhosa people throughout Kaffraria.

The area's economy depended on cattle and sheep ranching, and the town itself has a large industrial base producing textiles, soap, candles, sweets, cartons and clothing. Its proximity to the new provincial capital city of Bhisho has brought much development to the area since the end of apartheid in 1994.

In 2007 the Eastern Cape government considered plans to give the city a new Bantu name. The city officially became Qonce on 21 February 2021.

The city is also home to Huberta, one of the farthest-travelling hippopotami in South Africa. It is preserved in the Amathole Museum in the CBD.

Notable people 
 King  Maxhob'ayakhawuleza Sandile "Aa! Zanesizwe!", the King and ruler of the Rharhabe House of the Xhosa Kingdom.
 King Jonguxolo Sandile "Aa! Vul'ulwandle!", the King and ruler of the Rharhabe House of the Xhosa Kingdom.
 Steve Biko, anti-Apartheid Black Consciousness Movement leader was born here
 Andile Yenana, South African pianist
 Charles Patrick John Coghlan, first premier of Rhodesia was born here
 Buster Farrer, former international cricket, tennis and hockey player
 Garry Pagel, former South African rugby union player was born here
 John Tengo Jabavu, founder of the first Xhosa-language newspaper in South Africa
 Griffiths Mxenge, anti-Apartheid activist
 Victoria Mxenge, anti-Apartheid activist
 Steve Tshwete, anti-Apartheid activist
 Makhaya Ntini, former South African Test cricketer
 Raven Klaasen, professional tennis player
 Lukhanyo Am, South African Rugby union team player
 CB Jennings, South African Rugby union team player and mayor of King William's Town

References

External links

 History of King William's Town

 
Populated places in Buffalo City Metropolitan Municipality
Populated places established in 1835